This is a list of singles that charted in the top ten of the Billboard Hot 100, an all-genre singles chart in the United States, in 2023.

Top-ten singles
An asterisk (*) represents that a single is in the top ten as of the issue dated for the week of March 18, 2023.

Key
 – indicates single's top 10 entry was also its Hot 100 debut

2022 peaks

Holiday season

Notes 
Prior to the chart dated March 11, 2023, "Die for You" was credited to The Weeknd only.

The single re-entered the top ten on the week ending January 14, 2023.
The single re-entered the top ten on the week ending February 18, 2023.
The single re-entered the top ten on the week ending March 18, 2023.

See also 
 2023 in American music
 List of Billboard Hot 100 number ones of 2023

References

External links
Billboard.com
Billboard.biz
The Billboard Hot 100

United States Hot 100 Top Ten Singles
2023